Bida Airport  is an airport serving Bida in Nigeria.

The Bida VOR/DME (ident: BDA) and Bida Non-directional beacon (ident: BD) are located on the airfield.

See also
Transport in Nigeria
List of airports in Nigeria

References

External links
 OpenStreetMap - Bida Airport
 OurAirports - Nigeria
 FallingRain - Bida
 

Airports in Nigeria